Melanthiales Link (melanthoid lilies) was an order of monocotyledons, whose name and botanical authority is derived by typification from the description of the type family, Melanthiaceae by Johann Heinrich Friedrich Link in 1829.

In Rolf Dahlgren's 1982 classification,  he placed the Melanthiaceae in the Liliales order. In his 1985 revision he elevated the family to the order Melanthiales by taking two closely related genera, Campynemanthe and Campynemanthe from the Colchicaceae and creating the family Campynemaceae, (most other authors have preferred Campynemataceae), and then placing Melanthiaceae and Campynemaceae together to form Melanthiales sensu Dahlgren. In this circumscription Melanthiales was one of five orders belonging to the superorder Liliiflorae. Later, Melanthiales was included by Takhtajan in the 2009 revision of his system as an order of superorder Lilianae (as the Liliiflorae were renamed). Overall, the taxonomic history has been complex, and has included positioning this group as a subfamily (Melanthioideae) within the family Liliaceae sensu lato.

With the major reorganisation of the angiosperms that resulted from molecular phylogenetics, a "Melanthiaceae" and a "Campynemataceae" clade emerged as one of four major groups within Liliales, together with "Liliaceae" and "Colchicaceae". Consequently, these two families were then included in the order Liliales (lilioids) as separate families, and the order Melanthiales was discontinued. These transfers represent one of the few departures of the modern system from Dahlgren's radical reorganisation of the Lilianae superorder.

See also 
 Taxonomy of Liliaceae

References

Bibliography 

 
 
 
  In 
 
 
 
  In 
 
  Excerpts
 

Historically recognized angiosperm orders
Taxa named by Johann Heinrich Friedrich Link